Adriano (born June 20, 1980), full name Adriano Padilha Nascimento, is a Brazilian football player who last played for Atlético de Ibirama as a forward.

Career
In January 2006 Adriano signed for Russian Premier League team FC Saturn on a four-year contract. After spending the 2006-07 season on loan at Süper Lig side Denizlispor, Adriano signed for fellow Süper Lig team İstanbul BB.

After a brief return to Brazil with Paraná, Adriano signed a two-year contract with FK Baku in the Azerbaijan Premier League.

In May 2013 Adriano signed for Marcílio Dias.

European career statistics

Honours
Grêmio
Campeonato Gaúcho (1): 1999
Ituano
Campeonato Paulista (1): 2002

References

External links

 Profile at TFF.org 
 

1980 births
Living people
Brazilian footballers
Brazilian expatriate footballers
Brazilian expatriate sportspeople in Turkey
Expatriate footballers in Turkey
Expatriate footballers in Azerbaijan
Expatriate footballers in Russia
Figueirense FC players
Clube Atlético Sorocaba players
FC Saturn Ramenskoye players
Denizlispor footballers
İstanbul Başakşehir F.K. players
Paraná Clube players
FC Baku players
Süper Lig players
Association football forwards